Gold Star Studios was an independent recording studio located in Los Angeles, California, United States. For more than thirty years, from 1950 to 1984, Gold Star was one of the most successful commercial recording studios in the world.

Founded by David S. Gold and Stan Ross and opened in October 1950, Gold Star Recording Studios was located at 6252 Santa Monica Boulevard near the corner of Vine Street in Hollywood, the studio name was a combination of the names of the two owners -- (Dave) GOLD and STA(n) R(oss). The studio was renowned for its unique custom-designed recording equipment, which was designed and built by Gold, and for its echo chambers (also designed and built by Gold), which were utilised heavily by producers, most notably, Phil Spector.

Many big bands and orchestras recorded at Gold Star. Band leader Phil Carreon and Vocalist Ray Vasquez recorded at the facility in the 1950s.

Peak years
In the mid-1950s, aspiring pop star and future record producer Phil Spector began hanging out at local studios, including Gold Star, hoping to learn about recording. He eventually gained the confidence of Gold Star's house producer-engineer Stan Ross, who took Spector under his wing and taught him the basics of record production. In the early 1960s, Spector used Gold Star as the venue for most of his "Wall of Sound" recordings. It was also used for many important recordings by the Beach Boys, including portions of their 1966 LP Pet Sounds, the international #1 hit "Good Vibrations", and recordings for the aborted Smile project.

The studio was known for its echo chambers. The walls were thick, specially-formulated cement plaster on heavy isolation forms.

Gold Star was responsible for what is believed to be the first commercial use of the production technique called flanging, which was featured on the single "The Big Hurt" by Toni Fisher, written and produced by Wayne Shanklin, who also originated the flanging technique. This was done by placing his thumb on the "flange" of the recording tape reel during vocal playback, which caused the flanging effect when mixed in with the original vocal track. Another of Gold's innovations was a small transmitter that allowed him to broadcast mixes so that they could be picked up on a nearby car radio, which was especially important to recording artists in the era when AM radio was the dominant broadcast medium.

Artists
The studio was the venue for hundreds of chart-topping recordings by scores of leading pop and rock artists including Ritchie Valens, Eddie Cochran, Hugh Masekela, The Chipmunks, The Champs, The Cascades, Bobby Troup, Phil Spector, Ray Vasquez, Darlene Love, Donna Loren, Delaney Bramlett, Liza Minnelli, Brian Wilson, Sonny & Cher, Dobie Gray, Billy Strange, The Rose Garden, Merle Haggard,  Modern Folk Quartet, Buffalo Springfield, The Seeds, Duane Eddy, Jimi Hendrix, Neil Young, The Ronettes, Dick Dale, The Sonics, The Righteous Brothers, Ike and Tina Turner, Jackie DeShannon, William Shatner, Iron Butterfly, Black Oak Arkansas, Joe Cocker, Leon Russell, Fairport Convention, Herb Alpert & The Tijuana Brass, Jan and Dean, Dr. John, Dick and Dee Dee, Joan Jett, Cherie Currie, Meat Loaf, The Champs, Gram Parsons, The Murmaids, Flash Cadillac & the Continental Kids, Kim Fowley, The Sunrays, The Baja Marimba Band, The Turtles, Bobby Darin, The Cake, The Who, The Monkees, Tommy Boyce, The Band, The Go-Go's, The Ramones,  Flamin' Groovies, Blondie, Dan Hartman, Gary Numan, Legs Diamond,  Led Zeppelin, Herb Jeffries, The Association, Art Garfunkel,  Neil Norman, Leonard Cohen, Bob Dylan, and Maurice Gibb.

It was also widely used by music, film, television, radio and Broadway artists including Frank Loesser, Ben Weisman, Johnny Mercer, Sammy Fain, Bob Sherman, Dick Sherman and Dimitri Tiomkin and it was the recording ‘home’ of the pioneering ABC-TV prime-time pop show Shindig!. Donna Loren, a cast member of Shindig!, recorded there early in her career on the Crest label. Jazz artists who recorded there include Gerry Mulligan, Chet Baker, Oscar Moore, The Hi-Los and Louis Bellson.

Singer-songwriter Johnette Napolitano, co-founder of Concrete Blonde, was the studio's receptionist in the early 1980s.

Closing
Shifting economics caused Gold Star to close its doors in 1984, as newer technology allowed bands to make their own recordings.  Several months after the studios were vacated, a fire destroyed the building.  A mini-mall was later constructed on the site.

On March 11, 2011, Ross died of complications following an operation to correct an abdominal aneurysm.  He was 82.

References

External links

David Gold Interview - NAMM Oral History Library (2015)

Recording studios in California
 
Buildings and structures in Hollywood, Los Angeles
Demolished buildings and structures in Los Angeles
Music of Los Angeles
Companies based in Los Angeles
Entertainment companies based in California
Entertainment companies established in 1950
Mass media companies established in 1950
Mass media companies disestablished in 1984
1950 establishments in California
1984 disestablishments in California
Defunct companies based in Greater Los Angeles